Yong'en (永恩; 12 Sep 1727 – 10 Apr 1805; 8th) was the second son of Chong'an, Prince Kangxiu of the First Rank.

Life 
He held the title of beile from 1734 to 1753, when his uncle Ba'ertu succeeded to the title of Prince Kang of the First Rank. He succeeded the peerage under the title Prince Kang of the First Rank in 1753.

By the virtues of his ancestor Daišan, the peerage was renamed to "Prince Li of the First Rank" in 1778. Yong'en was described as respectful, indifferent and thrifty to himself.  The prince was versed in art and literature - he created several pictures inspired by "Eight Houses of Jinling" and Lu Qiang. His written works include:
"Collection of Studio of Benefit" (《益斋集》, pinyin: yizhaiji), 
"The story of the family of Yaonai" (《姚鼐撰家传》, pinyin: yaonaizhuanjiachuan), 
Four types of ripple garden" (《漪园四种》, pinyin: yiyuansizhong) 
 "History of the Hall of Sincere Rightness" (《诚正堂稿》, pinyin: chengzhengtanggao).

Yong'en held the peerage until his death on 10 April 1805. He was  posthumously honoured as Prince Li Gong of the First Rank (禮恭親王, "gong" meaning "respectful" or "reverent").

Family 
Father: Chong'an, Prince Kangxiu of the First Rank
Mother: Lady Sirin Gioro, Secondary consort
Consorts and issue:
 Primary consort, lady Ujaku
 Second primary consort, lady Šumuru
 Zhaolian, first son
 Mistress, of the  Sun clan (妾 孙氏)

Ancestry

References 

1727 births
1805 deaths

18th-century Chinese people
Qing dynasty imperial princes
Prince Li